The forktail blue-eye (Pseudomugil furcatus) is a species of fish in the subfamily Pseudomugilinae. It is endemic to Papua New Guinea south-east of Popondetta, where found in rainforest streams.

It used to be placed in genus Popondetta or even separated as Popondichthys, but this is now considered erroneous.

References 

 ITIS Standard Report Page: Popondichthys Furcatus

Forktail blue-eye
Freshwater fish of Papua New Guinea
Taxa named by John Treadwell Nichols
Fish described in 1955
Taxonomy articles created by Polbot